The Jerry E. Dickerman House is an historic house at 36 Field Avenue in the city of Newport, Vermont.  Built about 1875 for a prominent local lawyer and customs collector, it is a prominent regional example of residential Second Empire architecture.  It was listed on the National Register of Historic Places in 2001.

Description and history
The Jerry E. Dickerman House is located in downtown Newport, just north of the Goodrich Memorial Library on the east side of Field Avenue.  It is a -story wood-frame structure, with a clapboarded exterior and dormered mansard roof, which provides a full third floor.  The main facade is three bays wide, with the outer bays housing projecting polygonal window bays with bracketed roofs at each level.  The central bay projects slightly, and is capped by a larger facade dormer with a bellcast roof outline surrounding a round-arch balcony door opening.  The main entrance is at the ground level of this bay, sheltered by a porch with bracketed posts.  The interior of the main section of the house retains much of its original woodwork, despite a mid-20th century conversion to apartments.

The house was built about 1875, and was originally set facing Main Street, which was then lined by similarly fashionable houses of the community's upper class.  It was moved to its present location about 1930 to make room for a commercial building, and was converted into apartments in the 1940s or 1950s.  Maps of the period show about half a dozen or so Second Empire houses, of which only two are known to survive.

See also
National Register of Historic Places listings in Orleans County, Vermont

References

Houses on the National Register of Historic Places in Vermont
National Register of Historic Places in Orleans County, Vermont
Second Empire architecture in Vermont
Houses completed in 1875
Houses in Orleans County, Vermont
Buildings and structures in Newport (city), Vermont
Historic district contributing properties in Vermont